Zophar Mills was a fireboat operated by the Fire Department of New York City from 1883 to 1958.

Around 1882, Zohpar Mills reportedly collided with a pier at Little 12th Street (the present-day location of Little Island at Pier 55).

Other accounts say  was the first fireboat to be dispatched.

See also
 Fireboats in New York City

References 

Fireboats of New York City
1883 ships
Ships built by Pusey and Jones